Robert Elian Săceanu (born 22 June 1983), is a Romanian former football player, currently sporting director of FC U Craiova.

Honours
FC Universitatea Craiova
Divizia B: 2005–06

External links
 
 

1983 births
Living people
People from Corabia
Romanian footballers
Association football midfielders
Liga I players
Liga II players
Liga III players
FC U Craiova 1948 players
FC Gloria Buzău players
SCM Râmnicu Vâlcea players
ACF Gloria Bistrița players
FCV Farul Constanța players
AS Voința Snagov players